Superpower collapse is the societal collapse of a superpower nation state; the term is most often used to describe the dissolution of the Soviet Union but also can be applied to the loss of the United Kingdom's superpower status through the decline of the British Empire. Russia, the successor of the Soviet Union, and the United Kingdom are still regarded as great powers today with permanent seats on the United Nations Security Council. The United Kingdom continues to hold extensive global soft power, and hard power.

Russia holds the largest nuclear weapons arsenal in the world.

Soviet Union
Dramatic changes occurred in the Soviet Union and the Eastern Bloc during the 1980s and early 1990s, with perestroika and glasnost, the dramatic fall of the Berlin Wall in November 1989, and finally the dissolution of the Soviet Union in December 1991. As early as 1970, Andrei Amalrik had made predictions of Soviet collapse, and Emmanuel Todd made a similar prediction in 1976.

United States
  During the Cold War, the United States fought many proxy wars against Soviet-supported Marxist-Leninist and socialist states, but after the Soviet Union's dissolution, the US found itself as the world's sole superpower and was even deemed by some political theorists to be the world's sole hyperpower. Political theoreticians of the neorealist philosophy (known by many as neoconservatives) self-styled as the Blue Team, increasingly view China as a military threat, but there are relatively-strong economic ties between the two powers. Blue Team members favor containment and confrontation with China and strong American support of Taiwan.

In After the Empire: The Breakdown of the American Order (2001), French sociologist Emmanuel Todd predicts the eventual decline and fall of the United States as a superpower. "After years of being perceived as a problem-solver, the US itself has now become a problem for the rest of the world."

Recently, as a result of asymmetric polarization within the United States, as well as globally perceived U.S. foreign policy failures, and China's growing influence around the world, the United States may already be experiencing a decay in its soft power around the world.

United Kingdom
The British Empire was the most extensive empire in human history. It was the world's foremost power throughout the late 18th and 19th centuries, and achieved its largest extent in the 20th century. During this time, the United Kingdom acquired nation-state ownership and direct rule over large areas of the world. Britain's global power originated from the Industrial Revolution and because of its geography as a large maritime power off the coast of Western Europe. British political, economic, social and cultural influences dramatically shaped and created significant changes globally.

However, as other nations industrialized and social and political changes took place in the Empire, the idea of colonization and imperialism fell out of favour. In addition, the consequences of fighting two world wars in the 20th century within a relatively short amount of time hastened the decline of the Empire. The movement for self-determination of Britain's colonies started in the late 19th century and was well underway by the 1920s, seen for example through the emergence of the Indian National Congress in 1885 and the Balfour Declaration of 1926. Self-determination and movements for independence represented significant changes in political and social ideology. This culminated in a rapid wave of decolonization in the decades after World War II. It has also been argued that World War II saw the emergence of new powers, such as the United States and the Soviet Union, who were hostile to traditional imperialism and hastened its decline.

The Suez Crisis of 1956 is considered by some commentators to be the beginning of the end of Britain's period as a superpower, but other commentators have pointed to World War I, the Depression of 1920-21, the Partition of Ireland, the return of the pound sterling to the gold standard at its prewar parity in 1925, the loss of wealth from World War II, the end of Lend-Lease Aid from the United States in 1945, the postwar Age of Austerity, the Winter of 1946–47, the beginning of decolonization and the independence of British India as other key points in Britain's decline and loss of superpower status.

The Suez Crisis is regarded to be a political and diplomatic disaster for the United Kingdom, as it led to large-scale international condemnation, including extensive pressure from the United States and Soviet Union. This forced the British and the French to withdraw and cemented the increasingly-bipolar Cold War politics between the Soviet Union and United States. In the 1960s, the movement for decolonization reached its peak, with remaining imperial holdings achieving independence, accelerating the transition from the British Empire to the Commonwealth of Nations. The United Kingdom later experienced deindustrialization throughout the 1970s, coupled with high inflation and industrial unrest that unraveled the postwar consensus. This led to some to refer to the UK as the Sick Man of Europe. In 1976, the United Kingdom sought assistance from the International Monetary Fund which it had helped create, receiving funding of $3.9 billion, the largest-ever loan to be requested up until that point. Many see this as symbolising Britain's postwar decline. It is important to note however that other nations also experienced crippling inflation in the 1970s such as the United States, through the collapse of the Bretton Woods system in 1971–73.

The United Kingdom today retains extensive global soft power, including a formidable military. The United Kingdom has a permanent seat on the UN Security Council alongside only 4 other powers, and is one of the nine nuclear powers. Its capital city, London, is regarded as one of the pre-eminent cities in the world, ranking first in the Global Power City Index by the Mori Foundation. However, it has been assumed that recent economic difficulties exacerbated by Brexit may cause erosions to the UK's power. 
Nonetheless, in 2022, the United Kingdom was ranked 2nd in the world in soft power, ahead of every European country.

See also

 Amity-enmity complex
 Global policeman
 Potential superpowers
 Hegemony
 Ideocracy
 Ideology
 State collapse

References

International relations terminology
Societal collapse
Colapse